Perr may refer to:

Yechiel Perr (born 1935), American rabbi
Janet Perr, art director

See also
George Samuel Perrottet (1793–1870), French botanist who used the botanical author abbreviation "Perr."
Per (disambiguation)
Purr (disambiguation)